Aelian or Aelianus may refer to:

 Aelianus Tacticus, Greek military writer of the 2nd century, who lived in Rome
 Casperius Aelianus, Praetorian Prefect, executed by Trajan
 Claudius Aelianus, Roman writer, teacher and historian of the 3rd century, who wrote in Greek
 Lucius Aelianus, one of the thirty tyrants under the Roman empire
 Aelianus Meccius, ancient Greek physician, tutor of Galen
 Tiberius Plautius Silvanus Aelianus, adopted nephew of Plautia Urgulanilla, first wife of Claudius; consul 45 and 74 AD
 Aelianus (rebel), leader of the Bagaudae peasant rebels
 Aelianus (comes), leader of the Roman defensive forces at the Siege of Amida in 359.